Joana Vasconcelos (born 1971) is a Portuguese artist known for her large-scale installations.

Biography
Vasconcelos was born in 1971 in Paris, France. Her family returned home to Portugal after their exile to France and following the Carnation Revolution in 1974. She studied at the Centro de Arte & Comunicação Visual in Lisbon. In 2009 she received the Order of Prince Henry. She lives and works in Lisbon.

Work

Vasconcelos exhibited at the 2005 Venice Biennale where she included A Noiva (The Bride), a 20 ft. high chandelier made of over 14,000 OB Tampons.

In June 2011, the installation "Contaminação" opened the group exhibition The World Belongs to You, held at Palazzo Grassi.

In 2012, Vasconcelos showed her work at the major annual contemporary art exhibition in the Palace of Versailles. She was the first woman and the youngest contemporary artist to exhibit in Versailles.

In 2013 the artist represented Portugal in a solo show at the country's pavilion at the Venice Biennale. The work "Trafaria Praia" was installed in an anchored boat and at the same time a floating art gallery.

In 2018 Vasconcelos presented the retrospective exhibition "I'm Your Mirror" at the Guggenheim Museum in Bilbao, in Spain, having been the only Portuguese artist to accomplish the honor. The exhibition comprised 30 works representing 25 years of her artistic career.

In 2020, Vasconcelos created a massive site specific work, "Valkyrie Mumbet" at the Massachusetts College of Art and Design Museum (MAAM) in Boston, MA. This exhibition was her first solo show in the United States. The work is part of a series of large scale pieces the artist creates for specific spaces, in homage to inspiring women connected with that location. This particular work honors Elizabeth Mumbet Freeman, an enslaved person in Massachusetts who sued to win her freedom.

Solo exhibitions (selection) 
 2020: Valkyrie Mumbet, MassArt Art Museum, at the Massachusetts College of Art and Design, Boston, Massachusetts, United States
 2018: I'm Your Mirror, Guggenheim Museum Bilbao, Bilbao, Spain
 2013: Trafaria Praia, Portuguese Pavilion, 55th Venice Biennale, Venice, Italy
 2012: Royal Valkyrie, Château de Versailles, France
 2011: Res Publica, Centenário da República, Calouste Gulbenkian Foundation, Lisbon, Portugal
 2010: I Will Survive, Haunch of Venison, London, United Kingdom

Gallery

Notes

External links 
 Official Site

Further reading 
 Vasconcelos, Joana (2019). Joana Vasconcelos. Christian K. Scheffel, Christof Trepesch, Peter Joch, Galerie Scheffel. Köln, 2019. . OCLC 1090543439.
 Vasconcelos, Joana (2019). Joana Vasconcelos: maximal. Achim Sommer, Max Ernst Museum. Munich. . OCLC 1110580869
 Vasconcelos, Joana (2018). I'm your mirror. Enrique Juncosa, Petra Joos, Isalina Conde, Museo Guggenheim Bilbao, Museu Seralves, Kunsthal Rotterdam. Bilbao. . OCLC 1057784624.

1971 births
Living people
Artists from Paris
French emigrants to Portugal
People from Lisbon
20th-century Portuguese women artists
21st-century Portuguese women artists
Portuguese contemporary artists